A square wave is  a non-sinusoidal periodic waveform in which the amplitude alternates at a steady frequency between fixed minimum and maximum values, with the same duration at minimum and maximum. In an ideal square wave, the transitions between minimum and maximum are instantaneous. 

The square wave is a special case of a pulse wave which allows arbitrary durations at minimum and maximum amplitudes. The ratio of the high period to the total period of a pulse wave is called the duty cycle. A true square wave has a 50% duty cycle (equal high and low periods).

Square waves are often encountered in electronics and signal processing, particularly digital electronics and digital signal processing. Its stochastic counterpart is a two-state trajectory.

Origin and uses 

Square waves are universally encountered in digital switching circuits and are naturally generated by binary (two-level) logic devices. Square waves are typically generated by metal–oxide–semiconductor field-effect transistor (MOSFET) devices due to their rapid on–off electronic switching behavior, in contrast to bipolar junction transistors (BJTs) which slowly generate signals more closely resembling sine waves rather than square waves.

Square waves are used as timing references or "clock signals", because their fast transitions are suitable for triggering synchronous logic circuits at precisely determined intervals. However, as the frequency-domain graph shows, square waves contain a wide range of harmonics; these can generate electromagnetic radiation or pulses of current that interfere with other nearby circuits, causing noise or errors. To avoid this problem in very sensitive circuits such as precision analog-to-digital converters, sine waves are used instead of square waves as timing references.

In musical terms, they are often described as sounding hollow, and are therefore used as the basis for wind instrument sounds created using subtractive synthesis. Additionally, the distortion effect used on electric guitars clips the outermost regions of the waveform, causing it to increasingly resemble a square wave as more distortion is applied.

Simple two-level Rademacher functions are square waves.

Definitions 

The square wave in mathematics has many definitions, which are equivalent except at the discontinuities:

It can be defined as simply the sign function of a sinusoid:

which will be 1 when the sinusoid is positive, −1 when the sinusoid is negative, and 0 at the discontinuities.  Here, T is the period of the square wave and f is its frequency, which are related by the equation f = 1/T.

A square wave can also be defined with respect to the Heaviside step function u(t) or the rectangular function Π(t):

A square wave can also be generated using the floor function directly:

and indirectly:

Using the fourier series (below) one can show that the floor function may be written in trigonometric form

Fourier analysis  

Using Fourier expansion with cycle frequency  over time , an ideal square wave with an amplitude of 1 can be represented as an infinite sum of sinusoidal waves:

The ideal square wave contains only components of odd-integer harmonic frequencies (of the form ). Sawtooth waves and real-world signals contain all integer harmonics.

A curiosity of the convergence of the Fourier series representation of the square wave is the Gibbs phenomenon. Ringing artifacts in non-ideal square waves can be shown to be related to this phenomenon. The Gibbs phenomenon can be prevented by the use of σ-approximation, which uses the Lanczos sigma factors to help the sequence converge more smoothly.

An ideal mathematical square wave changes between the high and the low state instantaneously, and without under- or over-shooting. This is impossible to achieve in physical systems, as it would require infinite bandwidth.

Square waves in physical systems have only finite bandwidth and often exhibit ringing effects similar to those of the Gibbs phenomenon or ripple effects similar to those of the σ-approximation.

For a reasonable approximation to the square-wave shape, at least the fundamental and third harmonic need to be present, with the fifth harmonic being desirable. These bandwidth requirements are important in digital electronics, where finite-bandwidth analog approximations to square-wave-like waveforms are used. (The ringing transients are an important electronic consideration here, as they may go beyond the electrical rating limits of a circuit or cause a badly positioned threshold to be crossed multiple times.)

Characteristics of imperfect square waves 

As already mentioned, an ideal square wave has instantaneous transitions between the high and low levels. In practice, this is never achieved because of physical limitations of the system that generates the waveform. The times taken for the signal to rise from the low level to the high level and back again are called the rise time and the fall time respectively.

If the system is overdamped, then the waveform may never actually reach the theoretical high and low levels, and if the system is underdamped, it will oscillate about the high and low levels before settling down. In these cases, the rise and fall times are measured between specified intermediate levels, such as 5% and 95%, or 10% and 90%. The bandwidth of a system is related to the transition times of the waveform; there are formulas allowing one to be determined approximately from the other.

See also 
 List of periodic functions
 Rectangular function
 Pulse wave
 Sine wave
 Triangle wave
 Sawtooth wave
 Waveform
 Sound
 Multivibrator
 Ronchi ruling, a square-wave stripe target used in imaging.
 Cross sea
 Clarinet, a musical instrument that produces odd overtones approximating a square wave.

References

External links
 Fourier decomposition of a square wave Interactive demo of square wave synthesis using sine waves, from GeoGebra site.
 Square Wave Approximated by Sines Interactive demo of square wave synthesis using sine waves.
 Flash applets Square wave.

Waveforms
Fourier series